The World Group II was the second-highest level of Fed Cup competition in 2013. Four of the winners advanced to the World Group Play-offs, and the losing nations resorted to the World Group II Play-offs.

Switzerland vs. Belgium

Argentina vs. Sweden

Spain vs. Ukraine

France vs. Germany

References

See also
Fed Cup structure

World Group II